Mary O'Neal may refer to:
 Mary Thomas O'Neal, Welsh-born American labor activist
 Mary Lovelace O'Neal, American artist and arts educator

See also
 Mary O'Neill (disambiguation)